William Wesley Twelvetrees (born 15 November 1988) is a rugby union footballer who currently plays centre or fly-half for Gloucester Rugby and formerly played as inside centre for the England national rugby team.

Whilst playing for the Leicester Tigers, Twelvetrees was nicknamed '36' based on the Irish-accented pronunciation of twelvetrees by club captain Geordan Murphy, which sounded like "twelve threes", or 36.

Early life
Twelvetrees grew up in Wisborough Green, West Sussex. He is the son of Kevin Twelvetrees, a tree surgeon, and Beverley Twelvetrees. He attended Wisborough Green Primary School and later The Weald Secondary School in Billingshurst. He is the youngest of four brothers who were all encouraged to play rugby by their mother, Beverley, with his older brothers Jonathan and twins Matthew and Joseph providing suitable competition.

Growing up, Twelvetrees was active in a range of sports including football and cricket. During his youth he spent his summer weekends playing for Wisborough Green Cricket Club where he was proficient with the bat: "Billy’s still got the biggest hit for Wisborough Green Cricket Club. From the most distant wicket he cleared the pavilion with a six."

Twelvetrees spent his youth at a succession of Sussex rugby clubs, including a spell at Haywards Heath in the same side as Joe Marler but it was a family friend (a part-owner of Leicester Lions) who would provide Twelvetrees with his first foray into professional rugby. While Twelvetrees was with the Lions, a coach there put him in touch with the-then Leicester Tigers academy manager, Andy Key, and after playing summer Sevens by way of a trial, he was taken on.

He also received regular mentoring from expert players such as Fionn McLoughlin and Bobby Walsh, the latter being the first to suggest moving him to inside centre from fly-half. This move would prove very fruitious as his versatility led to more game time. Focusing on his passing game to compliment his natural physicality was a big priority at this time which made him a huge asset in the midfield, where he was regularly deployed as a second playmaker. Twelvetrees has remarked that this was imperative to him becoming a professional.

Club career
As a junior, Twelvetrees played for Pulborough, Horsham and Haywards Heath. He joined the Leicester Tigers academy from Leicester Lions in 2007, and moved to Bedford Blues for the 2008–09 season. After an outstanding season for Bedford, in which he scored 18 tries, 16 conversions and 13 penalties, he re-signed for Tigers in 2009.

He made his first appearance for Leicester in the Heineken Cup on 11 October, filling in for Dan Hipkiss, who was ruled out just prior to kick-off. Despite making his debut with just 10-minutes' notice, he won Man of the Match, scoring a try in a 14-point haul. Unfortunately, he was injured in his next match and ruled out for a large part of the season. He went on to make just six appearances in 2009–10, scoring four tries.

In the opening games of the 2010–11 season, Leicester lost Toby Flood, Jeremy Staunton and George Ford to injury and Twelvetrees was again thrust into the starting line-up, this time at fly-half.

On 28 January 2012, Twelvetrees signed a two-year deal to move from Leicester Tigers to play for Gloucester Rugby. However, on 27 September 2013, Twelvetrees signed a two-year contract extension to stay with Gloucester until the end of the 2015–16 season. On 15 August 2014, Twelvetrees was named new club captain for Gloucester for the 2014–15 season. In September 2017, he was awarded 'Try of the Week' for his week 4 try against Worcester Warriors.

In October 2021, Twelvetrees was awarded a testimonial year in honour of his 10th season with the club

International career

He was called up for the second string national side, England Saxons, in 2011.

A year later after leaving Leicester for Gloucester Twelvetrees was handed his first full international cap by Stuart Lancaster for England's Calcutta Cup clash with Scotland at Twickenham, scoring a try on his debut. On 12 June 2013, following an impressive performance against Argentina, Twelvetrees was called up to the British & Irish Lions tour of Australia due to concerns about possible injuries sustained by the fly halves and centres prior to the tests.

International tries

References

External links
Leicester Tigers profile
Gloucester Rugby profile

1988 births
Living people
Bedford Blues players
British & Irish Lions rugby union players from England
England international rugby union players
English rugby union players
Leicester Tigers players
People from Wisborough Green
Rugby union players from Chichester
Rugby union centres